Rodrigo Saraz (born August 26, 1978) is a Colombian footballer currently playing for Deportivo Coopsol of the Segunda Division in Peru. He plays as a striker.

Teams
  Atlético Nacional 1998-1999
  Deportivo UPAO 2000
  Sport Coopsol Trujillo 2001-2002
  Cienciano 2003-2004
  Universidad César Vallejo 2005
  Coronel Bolognesi 2005
  Cúcuta Deportivo 2006
  Sport Boys 2007
  Cienciano 2007
  Boyacá Chicó 2008
  Deportes Quindio 2008
  Envigado 2009
  Itagüí Ditaires 2010
  Deportivo Coopsol 2010–present

Titles
  Cienciano 2003 (Copa Sudamericana), 2004 (Recopa Sudamericana)
  Cúcuta Deportivo 2006 (Torneo Finalización)
  Boyacá Chicó 2008 (Torneo Apertura)

External links
 Profile at BDFA
 

1978 births
Living people
Colombian footballers
Footballers from Medellín
Atlético Nacional footballers
Sport Coopsol Trujillo footballers
Cienciano footballers
Club Deportivo Universidad César Vallejo footballers
Coronel Bolognesi footballers
Cúcuta Deportivo footballers
Sport Boys footballers
Boyacá Chicó F.C. footballers
Deportes Quindío footballers
Envigado F.C. players
Águilas Doradas Rionegro players
Colombian expatriate footballers
Expatriate footballers in Peru
Association football forwards